The Impulse to Preserve is Robert Gardner's 2006 memoir about his career creating actuality films. The book's title comes from the Philip Larkin quotation: "The impulse to preserve lies at the bottom of all art."

References

The Impulse to Preserve: Reflections of a Filmmaker

External links
 Robert Gardner website

Non-fiction books about film directors and producers
Show business memoirs
2006 non-fiction books